The 1972 Volta a Catalunya was the 52nd edition of the Volta a Catalunya cycle race and was held from 12 September to 17 September 1972. The race started in Tremp and finished in Badalona. The race was won by Felice Gimondi.

General classification

References

1972
Volta
1972 in Spanish road cycling
September 1972 sports events in Europe